Tiling may refer to:
The physical act of laying tiles
Tessellations

Computing
The compiler optimization of loop tiling
Tiled rendering, the process of subdividing an image by regular grid
Tiling window manager

People
Heinrich Sylvester Theodor Tiling (1818–1871), physician and botanist
Reinhold Tiling (1893–1933), German rocket pioneer

Other uses
Neuronal tiling
Tile drainage, an agriculture practice that removes excess water from soil
Tiling (crater), a small, undistinguished crater on the far side of the Moon

See also
Brickwork
Packing (disambiguation)
Tiling puzzle